Anthony Clark (born ) is an American cyclo-cross cyclist. He represented his nation in the men's elite event at the 2016 UCI Cyclo-cross World Championships in Heusden-Zolder.

Major results

2013–2014
 3rd Ellison Park #1
 3rd HPCX
2015–2016
 1st Overall Verge NECXS
1st NBX Gran Prix of Cross #2
 2nd NBX Gran Prix of Cross #1
 2nd CXLA Weekend #1
 3rd CXLA Weekend #2
 3rd The Cycle-Smart International #1
 3rd HPCX #1
 3rd North Carolina Grand Prix #2
2016–2017
 2nd Nittany Lion Cross #2
 3rd DCCX Day 1
2017–2018
 1st West Sacramento Grand Prix #1
 2nd DCCX Day 1
 2nd DCCX Day 2
 Qiansen Trophy
3rd Fengtai Changxindian
 3rd West Sacramento Grand Prix #2
2018–2019
 Kansai Cyclo Cross 
1st Makino
 1st Starlight-cross
 1st West Sacramento Grand Prix #1
 1st Rapha Supercross Nobeyama Day 1
 2nd Rapha Supercross Nobeyama Day 2
 Qiansen Trophy
3rd Aohan Station
 3rd Gran Prix of Gloucester #2

References

External links
 

1987 births
Living people
Cyclo-cross cyclists
American male cyclists
People from Agawam, Massachusetts
Cyclists from Massachusetts